Moșna is a commune located in Sibiu County, Transylvania, Romania. It is composed of three villages: Alma Vii, Moșna, and Nemșa. Moșna and Alma Vii have fortified churches.

The commune is situated on the Transylvanian Plateau, in the northern part of the county. The river Calva flows through Alma Vii.

The territory of the commune is the site of potential shale gas reserves; protests against drilling erupted in Moșna and Alma Vii in 2012–2013.

At the 2011 census, 84% of inhabitants were Romanians, 12.6% Roma, 1.8% Hungarians and 1.5% Germans.

Natives
Mircea Tutovan-Codoi

References

Communes in Sibiu County
Localities in Transylvania